Gull Rock is a small rock ledge  off the coast of Madison in New Haven County, Connecticut. It was named due to the large numbers of seabirds that rest there. Some parts of Gull Rock are covered in hardy plants during the summer months, and invertebrates thrive here. The island and its neighbors are occasionally considered to be part of the Thimble Islands, though this is uncommon. A steel seawall, now decrepit and unused, runs submerged from Gull Rock to the shore.

See also
Round Rock, Madison
Tuxis Island
Madison Reef
Thimble Islands
Outer Lands

References

Coastal islands of Connecticut
Madison, Connecticut
Landforms of New Haven County, Connecticut